Philip De Fries (born 21 April 1986) is a British mixed martial artist currently competing in the Heavyweight division of Konfrontacja Sztuk Walki, where he is the current KSW Heavyweight Champion. A professional competitor since 2009, De Fries has formerly competed for the UFC, Bellator, and M-1 Global.

Background
Born in Sunderland, De Fries is of Dutch origin through his paternal grandfather. He began training in Brazilian jiu-jitsu at the age of 14. He worked as a drugs counselor before and during his professional mixed martial arts career.

Mixed martial arts career

Early career
Since the very beginning of his MMA career, De Fries has shown great submission skills, defeating the likes of Darren Towler and Stav Economou. He made his professional debut in 2009.

Ultimate Fighting Championship
After his win over Stav Economou, De Fries was scouted and  signed a fight deal with the UFC.

De Fries was expected to make his debut against Oli Thompson at UFC 138.  However, on 17 October 2011, it was revealed that Thompson had to pull out of the bout due to injury and was replaced by Rob Broughton. De Fries won the fight via unanimous decision.

In his second UFC fight, De Fries faced Stipe Miocic on 15 February 2012 at UFC on Fuel TV 1. He lost the fight via KO in the first round.

De Fries faced former strongman Oli Thompson at UFC on Fox 4. He won the fight via submission in the second round.

De Fries was expected to face Matt Mitrione on 29 December 2012 at UFC 155. However, Mitrione stepped up to fight Roy Nelson at The Ultimate Fighter: Team Carwin vs. Team Nelson Finale and was replaced by Todd Duffee. De Fries lost via first round TKO due to punches.

Mitrione vs. De Fries eventually took place on 6 April 2013 at UFC on Fuel TV 9. He lost the bout via knockout 19 seconds into the first round. Following the loss De Fries was released from the promotion.

Post-UFC
Following his release from the UFC, De Fries returned to action on 31 December 2013 in Japan as he faced Strikeforce veteran Brett Rogers at Inoki Bom-Ba-Ye 2013. He won the fight via rear-naked choke in the first round.

He then faced Judo specialist Satoshi Ishii on the IGF 1 card which took place on 5 April 2014. De Fries lost this fight via unanimous decision.

Bellator MMA
De Fries made his Bellator MMA debut on 15 December 2017 at Bellator 191 against Pride FC vet James Thompson. He won the fight via submission in the first round.

KSW
On 8 February 2018 it was announced that De Fries had signed a four-fight contract with Polish MMA promotion Konfrontacja Sztuk Walki.

Heavyweight Championship reign
In the promotional debut De Fries faced Polish prospect Michał Andryszak for the vacant KSW Heavyweight Championship at KSW 43: Soldić vs. Du Plessis on 14 April 2018. De Fries won the fight via technical knockout in the first round and claimed the championship.

On 6 October 2018 De Fries made his first title defense against Karol Bedorf at KSW 45: The Return to Wembley, retaining his championship via keylock submission in the second round.

De Fries successfully defended his title against reigning KSW Light Heavyweight champion Tomasz Narkun at KSW 47 on 23 March 2019, winning the fight via unanimous decision.

De Fries was initially expected to make his next title defense against Damian Grabowski at KSW 50 on 14 September 2019. However, Grabowski was forced to withdraw from the bout due to an injury, and was replaced by Luis Henrique. De Fries won the fight by split decision.

In his 4th defense, De Fries faced Michał Kita on 19 December 2020 at KSW 57: De Fries vs. Kita. He won the fight via second-round TKO finish one minute into the second round.

De Fries rematched with Tomasz Narkun on 24 April 2021 at KSW 60: De Fries vs. Narkun 2. The pair previously met on 23 March 2019 in the main event at KSW 47: The X-Warriors, where De Fries defeated Narkun by unanimous decision and defended his KSW heavyweight title. He won the bout via ground and pound resulting in a TKO.

De Fries faced Darko Stošić at KSW 67 on 26 February 2022. He defended his title and won the bout via TKO after Stošić tapped due to combination of exhaustion and damage in the fifth round.

De Fries faced Ricardo Prasel on 10 September, 2022 at KSW 74. He defeated Prasel at the end of the first round, choking him out via rear-naked choke.

De Fries rematched Todd Duffee on February 25, 2023 at KSW 79. He defeated Duffee in the first round via ground and pount TKO.

Personal life
De Fries has two daughters (born 2016 and 2018).

Championships and Accomplishments
Konfrontacja Sztuk Walki
KSW Heavyweight Championship (1 time, current)
Eight successful title defenses
Submission of the Night (two times)

Mixed martial arts record

|-
|Win
|align=center|23–6 (1)
|Todd Duffee
|TKO (punches)
|KSW 79: De Fries vs. Duffee
|
|align=center|1
|align=center|3:46
|Liberec, Czech Republic
|
|-
|Win
|align=center|
|Ricardo Prasel
|Submission (rear-naked choke)
|KSW 74: De Fries vs. Prasel
|
|align=center|1
|align=center|4:10
|Ostrów Wielkopolski, Poland
|
|-
|Win
|align=center|21–6 (1)
|Darko Stošić
|TKO (submission to punches)
|KSW 67: De Fries vs. Stošić
|
|align=center|5
|align=center|3:44
|Warsaw, Poland
|
|-
|Win
|align=center|20–6 (1)
|Tomasz Narkun
|TKO (punches)
|KSW 60: De Fries vs. Narkun 2
|
|align=center|2
|align=center|3:37
|Łódź, Poland
|
|-
|Win
|align=center| 19–6 (1)
|Michał Kita
|TKO (punches)
|KSW 57: De Fries vs. Kita
|
|align=center|2
|align=center|0:59
|Łódź, Poland
|
|-
|Win
|align=center| 18–6 (1)
|Luis Henrique
|Decision (split) 
|KSW 50: London
|
|align=center|5 
|align=center|5:00 
|London, England
|
|-
| Win
| align=center| 17–6 (1)
|Tomasz Narkun
| Decision (unanimous)
|KSW 47: The X-Warriors
|  
| align=center| 5
| align=center| 5:00
| Łódź, Poland
|
|-
|-
| Win
|align=center|16–6 (1)
| Karol Bedorf
| Submission (americana)
|KSW 45: The Return to Wembley
|
|align=center| 2
|align=center| 4:26
|London, England
|
|-
| Win
|align=center|15–6 (1)
| Michał Andryszak 
| TKO (punches)
|KSW 43: Soldić vs. Du Plessis
|
|align=center| 1
|align=center| 3:32
|Wrocław, Poland
|
|-
|-
| Win
|align=center|14–6 (1)
| James Thompson 
| Submission (guillotine choke)
|Bellator 191
|
|align=center| 1
|align=center| 1:33
|Newcastle, England
|
|-
| Win
|align=center|13–6 (1)
| Anton Vyazigin 
| Decision (majority)
|M-1 Challenge 84: Kunchenko vs. Romanov
|
|align=center| 3
|align=center| 5:00
|Saint Petersburg, Russia
|
|-
| Loss
|align=center|12–6 (1)
|Ivan Shtyrkov
|TKO (elbows and punches)
|RCC Boxing Promotions: Day of Victory 72
|
|align=center| 1
|align=center| 1:51
|Yekaterinburg, Russia
|
|-
| Win
|align=center|12–5 (1)
| Thomas Denham 
| TKO (punches)
|M4tC 22: Warriors 
|
|align=center| 1
|align=center| 1:37
|Tyne and Wear, England
|
|-
| Loss
|align=center|11–5 (1)
| Thomas Denham 
| TKO (punches)
|M4tC 16: Invasion
|
|align=center| 1
|align=center| 1:01
|Tyne and Wear, England
|
|-
| Win
|align=center|11–4 (1)
| Łukasz Parobiec
| Submission (rear-naked choke)
|M4tC 15: Bad Blood
|
|align=center| 1
|align=center| 2:03
|Tyne and Wear, England
| 
|-
| Loss
|align=center|10–4 (1)
| Satoshi Ishii
| Decision (unanimous)
|Inoki Genome Fight 1
|
|align=center| 2
|align=center| 5:00
|Tokyo, Japan
| 
|-
| Win
|align=center|10–3 (1)
| Brett Rogers
| Submission (rear-naked choke)
|Inoki Bom-Ba-Ye 2013
|
|align=center| 1
|align=center| 3:45
|Tokyo, Japan
| 
|-
|  Loss
|align=center| 9–3 (1)
| Matt Mitrione
| KO (punches)
|UFC on Fuel TV: Mousasi vs. Latifi
|
|align=center| 1
|align=center| 0:19
|Stockholm, Sweden
| 
|-
| Loss
|align=center| 9–2 (1)
| Todd Duffee
| TKO (punches)
|UFC 155
|
|align=center| 1
|align=center| 2:04
|Las Vegas, Nevada, United States 
| 
|-
| Win
|align=center| 9–1 (1)
| Oli Thompson
| Submission (rear-naked choke)
| UFC on Fox: Shogun vs. Vera
| 
|align=center| 2
|align=center| 4:16
| Los Angeles, California, United States
| 
|-
| Loss
|align=center| 8–1 (1)
| Stipe Miocic
| KO (punches)
| UFC on Fuel TV: Sanchez vs. Ellenberger
| 
|align=center| 1 
|align=center| 0:43
| Omaha, Nebraska, United States
| 
|-
| Win
|align=center| 8–0 (1)
| Rob Broughton
| Decision (unanimous)
| UFC 138
| 
|align=center| 3
|align=center| 5:00
| Birmingham, England
| 
|-
| Win
|align=center| 7–0 (1)
| Stav Economou
| Submission (rear-naked choke)
| Ultimate Warrior Challenge 16
| 
|align=center| 2
|align=center| 3:56
| Southend-on-Sea, Essex, England
| 
|-
| Win
|align=center| 6–0 (1)
| Colin Robinson
| Submission (armbar)
| Supremacy Fight Challenge 2
| 
|align=center| 1
|align=center| 1:33
| Gateshead, Tyne and Wear, England
| 
|-
| Win
|align=center| 5–0 (1)
| Andy Spiers
| Submission (rear-naked choke)
| Supremacy Fight Challenge 1
| 
|align=center| 1
|align=center| 3:14
| Gateshead, Tyne and Wear, England
| 
|-
| NC
|align=center| 4–0 (1)
| Dave Wilson
| NC (punches to the back of the head)
| Tyneside Fighting Challenge
| 
|align=center| 1
|align=center| N/A
| Newcastle, Tyne and Wear, England
| 
|-
| Win
|align=center| 4–0
| Darren Towler
| Submission (D'Arce choke)
| Strike and Submit 14
| 
|align=center| 1
|align=center| 3:37
| Gateshead, Tyne and Wear, England
| 
|-
| Win
|align=center| 3–0
| Grant Hocking
| Submission (rear-naked choke)
| Strike and Submit 13
| 
|align=center| 1
|align=center| 1:35
| Gateshead, Tyne and Wear, England
| 
|-
| Win
|align=center| 2–0
| Jamie Sheldon
| Submission (rear-naked choke)
| Strike and Submit 12
| 
|align=center| 1
|align=center| 2:10
| Gateshead, Tyne and Wear, England
| 
|-
| Win
|align=center| 1–0
| Darren Towler
| Submission (rear-naked choke)
| Strike and Submit 10
| 
|align=center| 1
|align=center| 4:48
| Gateshead, Tyne and Wear, England
|

See also
 List of current KSW fighters
 List of male mixed martial artists

References

External links
 
 

1987 births
Living people
English male mixed martial artists
Heavyweight mixed martial artists
Mixed martial artists utilizing Brazilian jiu-jitsu
Ultimate Fighting Championship male fighters
English practitioners of Brazilian jiu-jitsu
People from Cleethorpes